Brøgger Glacier is a glacier  long, flowing west into the southern part of Undine South Harbour on the south coast of South Georgia. The name appears on a chart by Professor Olaf Holtedahl, Norwegian geologist who investigated South Georgia in 1928, and is probably for Professor Waldemar Brøgger, a Norwegian geologist and mineralogist, and member of the Norwegian Parliament, 1900–09.

See also
 List of glaciers in the Antarctic
 Glaciology

References 

Glaciers of South Georgia